The Academic Medical Center (Dutch: Academisch Medisch Centrum), or AMC, is the university hospital affiliated with the University of Amsterdam.  It is one of the largest and leading hospitals of the Netherlands, located in the Bijlmer neighborhood in the most south-eastern part of the city of Amsterdam. AMC consistently ranks among the top 50 medical schools in the world.

Services
The AMC has an intensive cooperation with the other university hospital of Amsterdam, the VU University Medical Center (VUmc), which is affiliated with the VU University Amsterdam, Amsterdam's other university.

Tertiary care departments include advanced trauma care, pediatric and neonatal intensive care, cardiothoracic surgery, neurosurgery, infectious diseases and other departments.

Special units include:
 Neurosurgery
 Cardiothoracic surgery
 Neonatal and pediatric surgery and intensive care
 Pediatric oncology
 Level I trauma center

Gallery

References

Teaching hospitals in the Netherlands
Hospitals in the Netherlands
Amsterdam-Zuidoost
Buildings and structures in Amsterdam